The phrase caput draconis means "dragon's head" (or "head of the dragon") in Latin.

Caput Draconis may refer to:

The "head" of the constellation Draco, consisting of the stars Eltanin, Rastaban, Kuma, and Grumium
The ascending lunar node
A geomantic figure in divination
Dracocephalum, a genus of plants
A password used to enter the Gryffindor common room in Harry Potter and the Philosopher's Stone, used first by Percy Weasley

See also
Dragon's Head (disambiguation)